The George T. Wisner House, also known as Oak Hill, is a historic home located on South Street in Goshen, New York, United States. It was built about 1840, and is a Greek Revival style frame dwelling that incorporates an earlier Federal style dwelling built about 1805.  It has a broad gabled roof and a central hall plan interior. The front section is  stories, five bays wide and four bays deep.

It was added to the National Register of Historic Places in 2005.

References

Houses on the National Register of Historic Places in New York (state)
Federal architecture in New York (state)
Greek Revival houses in New York (state)
Houses completed in 1805
Houses in Orange County, New York
National Register of Historic Places in Orange County, New York
Goshen, New York